Brent Tasman Crosswell (born 8 August 1950) is a former Australian rules footballer who played for the Carlton Football Club, North Melbourne Football Club and Melbourne Football Club in the Victorian Football League (VFL).

An articulate and outspoken individual, 'Tiger' Crosswell was renowned as one of the finest 'big game' players of his era and is one of a small group of VFL/AFL footballers to have won premierships with two clubs. He is recognized for his on-field achievements with Icon status in the Tasmanian Football Hall of Fame, as well as being named in the Tasmanian and North Melbourne Teams of the Century. Crosswell was also known for his tempestuous professional relationship with coach Ron Barassi, under whom he played at all three clubs for all but four of his fifteen seasons in the VFL.

Early life and career
Crosswell was born at Launceston's Queen Victoria Hospital to Darrell Crosswell and wife Ruby (née Parsons), He is a paternal first cousin of fellow VFL footballer Craig Davis, Crosswell was educated at Scotch College in Launceston, where he excelled both as a footballer and a high-jumper.

Recruited from Northern Tasmanian club Campbell Town, Crosswell made his VFL debut in 1968 for Carlton. A solid debut season earned him Carlton's 'best first year player' award. They won the 1968 Grand Final by three points. Crosswell was one of Carlton's best players in the famous 1970 Grand Final victory over Collingwood, and fittingly it was he who kicked the goal that put Carlton in front deep into the final quarter. He missed the 1972 premiership through illness.

Crosswell's finals form cannot be faulted and he featured in the best players list in all his Grand Finals appearances, except in 1976 when he injured himself against Geelong in muddy conditions the previous week. Not be discounted, the selection committee at the club selected Crosswell in the 1976 Grand Final side and gave North Melbourne a needed boost, but this was only temporary as his endurance was waning and the injury prevented him to give 100% that he wanted to show. When Barassi decided to leave North Melbourne, Crosswell moved to his third club, Melbourne, in 1980 and spent his final three seasons of football there, to end a career with one of the most Grand Final appearances by a player at the time: nine VFL Grand Finals.

Crosswell is said to be the inspiration for Tasmanian footballer Geoff Hayward in David Williamson's 1977 play The Club.

Crosswell studied an arts degree at Monash University. He was outspoken in opposing the Vietnam War, taking part in the Moratorium marches. Crosswell was a leading campaigner for achieving fairer pay for athletes, advocating strike action to address the exploitative pay conditions of professional football players.

Post playing career
Since the end of his career, Crosswell has lived with Ménière's disease. His football achievements received formal recognition when he was one of the inaugural inductees into the Tasmanian Football Hall of Fame in 2005. In July 2012, he was upgraded to Icon status.

Crosswell's son Tom Kavanagh also played in the VFL/AFL.

References

Bibliography

External links

Demon Wiki profile

1950 births
Living people
Australian rules footballers from Launceston, Tasmania
Carlton Football Club players
Carlton Football Club Premiership players
Four-time VFL/AFL Premiership players
Melbourne Football Club players
North Melbourne Football Club players
North Melbourne Football Club Premiership players
People educated at Scotch College, Launceston
People with Ménière's Disease
Tasmanian Football Hall of Fame inductees